Coleophora guttella is a moth of the family Coleophoridae. It is found in Turkestan and Uzbekistan.

The larvae feed on Artemisia turanica and Artemisia fragrans. They feed on the leaves of their host plant.

References

guttella
Moths described in 1979
Moths of Asia